Conrad von Rosen (1628–1715) was a soldier from Livonia, who served in the French army under Louis XIV from 1646 on. He fought in the Franco-Dutch War (1672–1678) and the Nine Years' War (1688–1691). In 1689 he went to Ireland with James II of England and commanded the Jacobite troops during the final stage of the unsuccessful Siege of Derry.

Family background 
Conrad was born on 29 September 1628 at Gross Roop (now Straupe) in Duchy of Livonia (now in Latvia). He was the third son of Fabian von Rosen (1590–1633) and his wife Sophia (1597–1673). His father's full name was Baron Fabian von Rosen of Klein-Roop and Raiskum; his wife's was Sophie von Mengden of Idsel and Maikendorf. The  was Baltic German and Lutheran.

Early career 
As a nobleman's younger son, Conrad von Rosen pursued a military career and in 1644 enlisted in the Swedish army as Livonia was at that time controlled by Sweden. However, he was exiled after killing an officer in duel. He then asked a relative, Reinhold von Rosen, who served in the French army, for a chance to relaunch his career. Reinhold appointed him an ensign in his regiment in 1646. Conrad de Rosen, as he was called, rose steadily through the ranks.

Marriage and children 
In 1660 he married Marie-Sophie de Rosen (1638–1686), Reinhold's only child.

Conrad and Marie-Sopie had ten children, but three boys died in their early childhood. The other seven are:
Reinhold Carl de Rosen (1666–1744), comte de Bollwiller, lieutenant general in the French Army
Georges Christophe, called the chevalier de Rosen, killed at the Battle of Landen in 1693 as a French captain
Anne Jeanne (1662–1727), married Nicolas-Frédéric de Rothenbourg (1646–1716)
Maria Sophia (1673–1740), married 1684 Baron Meinrad von Planta von Wildenberg, who was killed in the Battle of Landen in 1693
Johanna Renata, a nun at the Visitation of Nancy
Catharina Magdalena, a nun at the Visitation of Nancy

His father-in-law died in 1667 and Rosen inherited Dettwiller, and Bollwiller in Alsace. Bollwiller, however, had been pawned to the Fuggers by Reinhold, and Conrad had to pay his father-in-law's debt. He ceded his claims to parts of the Livonian family properties to his brother Otto (died 1709). In 1669 he became a colonel.

Franco-Dutch War (1672–1678) 
In the Franco-Dutch War (1672–1678), he excelled at the Battle of Seneffe (1674) under Condé and was appointed brigadier. After the campaign of 1675, Condé retired and was replaced by Luxembourg. In 1677 Rosen became maréchal de camp. Under Luxembourg he fought in the siege of Cambrai (1677) and was wounded. He fought, still under Luxembourg, in the Battle of Saint-Denis in August 1678 where he excelled. This was the last battle against the Spanish of the Franco-Dutch war. Peace was signed in September. However, the war against the Empire raged on. Peace between France and the Empire was only signed in January 1679. Rosen therefore served France in autumn 1678 on the upper Rhine under Marshal Créquy fighting the Imperial army under the Duke of Lorraine.

Between the wars 
In 1681 in a climate of increasing religious intolerance before the revocation of the Edict of Nantes Rosen found it necessary to convert to Catholicism. His children followed, his wife, however, stayed Lutheran. As a reward he was created comte de Bollwiller but he seems never to have used he title.

In 1682 he accompanied Marquis de La Trousse to Piedmont to ensure security during a risky diplomatic mission. That same year Louis XIV promoted him to lieutenant-general and in 1686 Rosen was appointed commander-in-chief in Languedoc.

Ireland 
In the Nine Years' War (1688–97) Louis XIV supported James II of England against William of Orange, who had overthrown James in the Glorious Revolution in England. James had fled to France. Ireland however remained in the hands of James's loyal viceroy Tyrconnell. Louis sent James to Ireland trying to reinstate him on the throne. Rosen arrived in Ireland with him at Kinsale on 12 March 1689, having sailed on the ship-of-the-line Entreprenant.
Rosen was the highest-ranking of the French officers sent to Ireland with James. Rosen was given the title Marshal of Ireland for the duration of his participation in the campaign.

Battle of the Fords 
On 12 March 1689 Rosen landed with James in Ireland. He went with him to Dublin and then joined the army in the north, taking part in the Jacobite victory at the crossing of the River Finn, called the "passing of the fords". He, together with the General Maumont, crossed the River Finn at Lifford, while Richard Hamilton and Berwick crossed that same river further north at Clady. The way to Derry was open.

Siege of Derry 

On 18 April Rosen advanced to under the walls of Derry with King James II, who in vain summoned the town to surrender. Rosen then returned to Dublin with the king, leaving the command of the siege to Lieutenant-General Count Maumont, who was however killed about a month later in a sally on 21 April. The command then devolved to Lieutenant-General Richard Hamilton, who lacked experience in sieges. As Hamilton did not make much progress, Rosen was sent back to Derry where he arrived around 20 June. He immediately adopted a much more hard-line approach towards the defenders than his predecessor. Rosen began bombarding the city in a more intense fashion, while also aiming to force the defenders to submit through starvation. He rounded up many Protestant inhabitants of the surrounding countryside who had previously been given legal protections by James and Hamilton, and on 2 July herded them towards the city walls hoping that the sight of them would dispirit the defenders. The garrison responded by threatening to hang Jacobite prisoners who had been taken during the siege. Hamilton quietly reported the matter to King James, who ordered Rosen to immediately cease such activities. James was furious and described the General as a "bloody Muscovite". He then asked Louis XIV to replace de Rosen.

Later service in Ireland 
Having failed to take Derry, the Jacobites withdrew southwards. Following the landing of Williamite reinforcements commanded by Schomberg and their capture of Carrickfergus, von Rosen advocated abandoning and burning Dublin and retreating behind the River Shannon, a policy that was rejected by James II. When the Williamite Army was encamped at Dundalk, he dramatically reversed his advice and suggested that the Jacobite army should launch an immediate attack. King James and Tyrconnell rejected this idea as they felt any assault on the entrenched position of the enemy would be suicidal.

In spring 1690 de Rosen and the French ambassador, d'Avaux, were replaced with Lauzun, who assumed both offices: top French commander in Ireland and French ambassador to James II. Lauzun arrived at Cork on 24 March together with seven French regiments. De Rosen and d'Avaux returned to France with that same fleet, departing from Cork on 8 April.

Back on the Continent 
On his return to France he was made maítre-de-camp général de la cavalerie. Rosen continued his career on the continent where he served under the Dauphin in Germany. In 1691 he commanded the sector of Cuesmes (or Quesme) south-east of the town in the siege of Mons under Boufflers. He commanded the right wing under Luxembourg in the Battle of Landen in July 1693. His son Georges-Christophe and his son-in-law Meinrad von Planta were killed in this battle. He also took part in the siege of Charleroi in October.

On 14 January 1703 he was one of the ten new Marshals of France appointed by Louis XIV. Together with the nine existing ones that made 19 Marshals of France. Being now marshal, Rosen sold his charge of maître-de-camp général de cavalerie to François Éléanor Montpéroux. In 1705 he became a knight of the Order of the Holy Spirit. This gave him the right to wear the blue sash called the cordon bleu that hangs over his right shoulder on his portrait by Hyacinthe Rigaud.

Death and timeline 
Conrad de Rosen died on 3 August 1715 at his castle in Bollweiler, Alsace. He was succeeded by his eldest son, Reinhold Carl, as comte de Bollwiller.

Notes and references

Citations

Sources 

  – Marshals of France
  – Knights of the Order of the Holy Spirit and general index
 
 
  – (Preview)
  – (Snippet view)
 
  – Additions to the 2nd edition (for Rosen)
  – REV to RYM (for Rosen)
  – 1703 to 1705
 
 
  – 1703 
  – 1714 to 1715 
 

 

 

1628 births
1715 deaths
Baltic-German people
French generals
German emigrants to France
Jacobite military personnel of the Williamite War in Ireland
People from Pārgauja Municipality
People from Livonia